After Hugo Egmont Hørring's resignation as Council President, Hannibal Sehested of the conservative party Højre became the leader of the new cabinet, which replaced the Cabinet of Hørring. It consisted entirely of members of the party Højre, was formed on 27 April 1900 and was called the Cabinet of Sehested. 

The cabinet was replaced by the Cabinet of Deuntzer on 24 July 1901.

List of ministers and portfolios
Some of the terms in the table begin before  27 April 1900 because the minister was in the Cabinet of Hørring as well.

References

1900 establishments in Denmark
1901 disestablishments
Sehested